(Sustain us, Lord with your word), 126, is a cantata by Johann Sebastian Bach for use in a Lutheran service. He composed the chorale cantata in 1725 in Leipzig for the Sunday Sexagesimae, the second Sunday before Lent, and first performed it on 4 February 1725. It is based on the hymn "" by Martin Luther, published in 1542. The hymn text at Bach's time also included two stanzas by Justus Jonas and Luther's "Verleih uns Frieden gnädiglich".

An unknown librettist retained four of these seven combined stanzas, using the first and the two last unchanged as customary, and expanding the third by adding text for a recitative. He paraphrased the other stanzas for two arias and another recitative. Bach structured the cantata in six movements and scored it for three vocal soloists, a four-part choir and a Baroque instrumental ensemble of trumpet, oboe, strings and continuo. The first movement is a chorale fantasia dominated by the trumpet. In the unusual third movement, Bach has an alto and a tenor voice alternate for the recitative, while they sing the lines from the third hymn stanza in a duet. The fourth movement is a dramatic bass aria, accompanied by a restless continuo. Due to the compiled hymns, the melody of the closing two stanzas is different from the one used in movements 1 and 3.

History and words 
Bach held the position of Thomaskantor (director of church music) in Leipzig from 1723. During his first year, beginning with the first Sunday after Trinity, he wrote a cycle of cantatas for the occasions of the liturgical year. In his second year he composed a second annual cycle of cantatas, which was planned to consist exclusively of chorale cantatas, each based on one Lutheran hymn.

As part of this cycle, Bach composed Erhalt uns, Herr, bei deinem Wort for Sexagesima, the second Sunday before Lent. The prescribed readings for the Sunday were taken from the Second Epistle to the Corinthians, "God's power is mighty in the weak", and from the Gospel of Luke, the parable of the Sower. The cantata is based on the hymn "" by Martin Luther.

The result are seven stanzas:

 
 
 
 
 
 
 

A line in the epistle, "For the word of God is quick and powerful, and sharper than any two-edged sword", possibly prompted the choice of the hymn. The unknown poet of the cantata text kept stanzas 1, 3, 6 and 7 unchanged, expanding 3 by recitative, and reworded 2, 4 and 5 for the respective movements of the cantata. The topic of the gospel is God's word, as Jesus explains in verse 11, "Now the parable is this: The seed is the word of God.", which is mentioned in the first line of the hymn, "bei deinem Wort" (close to your word). Instead of relating closely to the parable, the poet concentrates on a general request to God: to keep his people faithful to his word, to protect them from enemies and to provide peace.

Bach first performed the cantata on 4 February 1725, only two days after the cantata , for the Purification of Mary on 2 February. The autograph of the cantata is lost, but the parts which Bach used are extant. The cantata is the third-to-last chorale cantata in Bach's second cantata cycle.

Music

Structure and scoring 
Bach structured the cantata in six movements. In the typical format of Bach's chorale cantatas, the first and last movement on the first and stanza of the hymn are set for choir, as a chorale fantasia and a closing chorale. They frame alternating arias and recitatives with the librettist's text. Bach scored the work for three vocal soloists (alto (A), tenor (T) and bass (B)), a four-part choir, and a Baroque instrumental ensemble: trumpet (Tr), two oboes (Ob), two violins (Vl), viola (Va), and basso continuo (Bc). The duration of the piece has been stated as 22 minutes.

In the following table of the movements, the scoring follows the Neue Bach-Ausgabe. The keys and time signatures are taken from Alfred Dürr, using the symbol for common time (4/4). The instruments are shown separately for winds and strings, while the continuo, playing throughout, is not shown.

Movements

1 
The opening chorus, "" (Sustain us, Lord with your word,), is a chorale fantasia. A characteristic feature of the instrumental concerto is a four-note trumpet signal, which is derived from the beginning of the chorale melody, as if to repeat the words "" (Sustain us, Lord) again and again. The motif consists of the three notes of the A minor chord in the sequence A C A E, with the higher notes on the stressed syllables, the highest one on "Herr". The cantus firmus of the chorale is sung by the soprano, while the other voices sing in imitation, embedded in the independent concerto of the orchestra. The Bach scholar Christoph Wolff notes that the trumpet fanfare "underlines the combative, dogmatic character of this late devotional song of Luther's".

2 
The first aria, sung by the tenor, "" (Send Your power from above), is a prayer, intensified by two oboes. In the middle section the words "" (delight) and "" (scatter) are illustrated by runs in the voice.

3 
Movement 3 presents two text elements interwoven, the recitative "" (The wish and will of mankind are of little use), and the interspersed four lines of the hymn's third stanza, "" (God, Holy Spirit, worthy Comforter). The recitative lines are sung by alternating voices alto and tenor, while the interspersed chorale lines are rendered by both voices in duet. In this duet, the voice that enters sings the embellished hymn tune, while the other accompanies.

4 
The second aria, "" (Hurl to the ground the pompous proud!), is dramatic, especially in the restless continuo. John Eliot Gardiner quotes William G. Whittaker: Bach’s "righteous indignation at the enemies of his faith was never expressed more fiercely than in this aria". The Bach scholar Alfred Dürr describes the movement as an "aria of genuinely baroque dramatic force", expressing "Old Testament zeal".

5 
A tenor recitative, "" (Thus Your word and truth will be revealed), changes the topic and leads to peace, implored in the final movement.

6 
Movement 6 combines the two stanzas from different chorales, Luther's "" (Grant us peace graciously), and Walter's "" (Give our rulers and all lawgivers peace and good government), in a four-part setting. These two stanzas have a different melody.

Recordings 
The selection is taken from the listing on the Bach-Cantatas website. Instrumental groups playing period instruments in historically informed performances are highlighted green under the header "".

References

Bibliography 
Scores
 
 

Books
 
 

Online sources

External links 
 BWV 126 Erhalt uns, Herr, bei deinem Wort English translation, University of Vermont
 Cantata BWV 126 Uphold us, Lord, by Thy dread Word  Breitkopf
 Cantata No. 126 / Erhalt uns, Herr, bei deinem Wort / (BWV 126) Kalmus
 Luke Dahn: BWV 126.6 bach-chorales.com

Church cantatas by Johann Sebastian Bach
1725 compositions
Chorale cantatas